Sari Kristiina Marjamäki  (born 17 December 1971) is a Finnish retired ice hockey forward. She played 217 matches as a member of the Finnish national team and represented Finland at sixteen top-level international competitions: three Olympic women's ice hockey tournaments, eight World Championships, and five European Championships. She won an Olympic bronze medal in the inaugural women's ice hockey tournament at the 1998 Winter Olympics, six World Championship bronze medals, four European Championship gold medals, and one European Championship bronze medal.

Marjamäki's career in the Naisten SM-sarja spanned 401 matches across 23 seasons. She played with the Ässät, the Ilves, and the Espoo Blues and won four Finnish Championship (SM) gold medals, two SM silver medals, and four SM bronze medals. Over her 23 seasons in the Naisten SM-sarja, Marjamäki scored 339 goals and tallied 253 assists for a 592 regular season career point total and sole possession of fifth on the Naisten SM-sarja all-time career points list (excluding statistics after the league renamed to Naisten Liiga in 2017).

Since her retirement in 2009, Marjamäki has received numerous awards and honors in recognition of her accomplishments and positive influence on women's ice hockey in Finland. In 2014, she was inducted into the Hockey Hall of Fame Finland, becoming the Suomen Jääkiekkoleijona #223 (the Finnish Ice Hockey Lion #223). She was honored as an Ilves Hockey Legend at a ceremony held on 7 March 2020.

She and her husband, Kärpät head coach Lauri Marjamäki, have two children, a daughter (born in 2008) and a son.

Career statistics

Regular season and postseason 
Bold indicates led league

Awards and honors

Awards

Other acheivements 

 3rd in Naisten Liiga all-time regular season goals (as of 18 January 2023)
 6th in Naisten Liiga regular season games played (as of 18 January 2023)
 1st in Ässät all-time regular season points, goals, assists and games played (as of 18 January 2023)
 Named an Ilves Hockey Legend

References

External links
 
 
 

1971 births
Living people
Espoo Blues Naiset players
Finnish women's ice hockey forwards
Ice hockey players at the 1998 Winter Olympics
Ice hockey players at the 2002 Winter Olympics
Ice hockey players at the 2006 Winter Olympics
Ilves Naiset players
Medalists at the 1998 Winter Olympics
Olympic bronze medalists for Finland
Olympic ice hockey players of Finland
Olympic medalists in ice hockey
Sportspeople from Pori
Ässät Naiset players